Amarpal Singh Ajnala alias  Boni Ajnala is an Indian politician and belongs to the Bhartiya Janta Party. He was a member of Punjab Legislative Assembly and represented Ajnala.

For a short while he joined Shiromani Akali Dal (Taksali).

Family
He is son of Rattan Singh Ajnala, a 3 time MLA from Ajnala & former MP Khadoor Sahib Loksabha.

Political career
Ajnala first contested Punjab Legislative Assembly in Ajnala constituency by-election in 2004 but was defeated. However he was successful during 2007 Punjab elections. He was re-elected in 2012.

Electoral performance

References

Living people
Shiromani Akali Dal politicians
Indian Sikhs
Punjab, India MLAs 2007–2012
Punjab, India MLAs 2012–2017
Year of birth missing (living people)
People from Amritsar district
Place of birth missing (living people)
Shiromani Akali Dal (Taksali) politicians